The Women's giant slalom competition at the FIS Alpine World Ski Championships 2023 was held at Roc de Fer ski course in Méribel on 16 February 2023.

Results
The first run was started at 09:45 and the second run at 13:30.

References

Women's giant slalom